Sophie Charlotte Bray,  (born 12 May 1990) is an English international field hockey player who played as a forward for England and Great Britain.

She currently plays club hockey in the Investec Women's Hockey League Premier Division for East Grinstead.

Personal life
Bray lives in Claygate, Surrey but was born in France where her father worked as a marketing consultant. Back in England she played tennis and football at local clubs, representing Surrey at tennis aged 11. She gave up playing tennis and played football for Fulham Ladies, because she preferred a team sport. She was educated at Tiffin Girls' School, Kingston upon Thames joining Surbiton Hockey Club during her time at the school, initially playing for the colts aged 16, before progressing to the senior team.

She attended the University of Birmingham where she studied psychology.

Career
Bray competed for England in the women's hockey tournament at the 2014 Commonwealth Games where she won a silver medal, and was a member of the Investec sponsored winning team at the EuroHockey Championships in 2015.

In 2016, she competed for Team GB in the women's Olympic field hockey tournament at the 2016 Summer Olympics in Rio de Janeiro, where Team GB won gold in the final against the Netherlands after a penalty shoot out.

Bray was appointed Member of the Order of the British Empire (MBE) in the 2017 New Year Honours for services to hockey.

Bray has also played for Surbiton, Uni of Birmingham and in the Netherlands for MOP Hockey Club, Vught, near Eindhoven and most recently Kampong.

On 4 February 2019, Bray announced her retirement from international hockey. During her international career she scored 44 goals and made 134 appearances for England and Great Britain.

Honours and achievements

International

Great Britain
 Gold medal in field hockey at the 2016 Summer Olympics

England
 Gold medal in 2015 Women's EuroHockey Nations Championship
 Silver medal in Hockey at the 2014 Commonwealth Games
 Bronze medal in Hockey at the 2018 Commonwealth Games
 Bronze medal in 2017 Women's EuroHockey Nations Championship

Individual
 Investec Women's Hockey League Player of the Season 2018–2019

References

External links
 

 
 
 

1990 births
Living people
English female field hockey players
British female field hockey players
Olympic field hockey players of Great Britain
Olympic gold medallists for Great Britain
Olympic medalists in field hockey
Field hockey players at the 2016 Summer Olympics
Medalists at the 2016 Summer Olympics
Commonwealth Games silver medallists for England
Commonwealth Games medallists in field hockey
Field hockey players at the 2014 Commonwealth Games
People educated at the Tiffin Girls' School
Alumni of the University of Birmingham
Members of the Order of the British Empire
Female field hockey forwards
Expatriate field hockey players
English expatriate sportspeople in the Netherlands
People from Grasse
SV Kampong players
Surbiton Hockey Club players
French emigrants to the United Kingdom
East Grinstead Hockey Club players
University of Birmingham Hockey Club players
Sportspeople from Alpes-Maritimes
Medallists at the 2014 Commonwealth Games